1941 Drexel Dragons football team was an American football team that represented Drexel Institute of Technology (later renamed Drexel University) as an independent during the 1941 college football season. In their 15th and final season under head coach Walter Halas (brother of George Halas, the Dragons compiled a 4–2–1 record.

Schedule

References

Drexel
Drexel Dragons football seasons
Drexel Dragons football